José de la Serna e Hinojosa, 1st Count of the Andes (May 1, 1770 – July 6, 1832) was a Spanish general and colonial official. He was the last Spanish viceroy of Peru to exercise effective power (January 29, 1821 to December 1824).

Background

He entered the army at a young age and saw his first service (as a cadet) in the defense of Ceuta against the Moors in 1784. Later he saw service against the French in Catalonia (1795), against the British under Admiral José de Mazarredo (1797), and in the second siege of Zaragoza (1809). During the latter battle he was captured and taken to France as a prisoner. He soon escaped.

Thereafter he traveled in Switzerland and the Orient, finally returning to Spain in 1811. In Spain he fought under Wellington in the Spanish War of Independence against the French, until the expulsion of the latter in 1813.

In command of Spanish forces in Alto Perú

In 1816, having risen to the rank of major general, he was appointed to take command of the Spanish forces in Peru battling the insurgents. He arrived in Callao on September 22, 1816 and proceeded directly to Alto Perú (now Bolivia). He took charge of the army in Cotagaita on November 12, 1816. Viceroy Joaquín de la Pezuela ordered De la Serna to attack Argentine insurgents in the province of Tucumán, but De la Serna opposed this plan, citing insufficient forces.

De la Serna had advanced as far as Salta when the Spanish were surprised by the appearance in February 1817 of José de San Martín's Army of the Andes in Chile. San Martín had made an arduous, 21-day crossing of the mountains from Argentina. He conquered Chile, and De la Serna's army in Alto Perú was reduced to defensive warfare against various rebel groups in different parts of the country.

The coup against Pezuela

Serna's relations with Viceroy De la Pezuela further deteriorated. (De la Pezuela was an absolutist and De la Serna a liberal.) De la Serna finally asked to be relieved so that he could retire to Spain. Permission was received in May 1819, and in September he resigned the command of the army to General José Canterac. He had partisans in Lima, and upon his arrival there they demonstrated in favor of his remaining in Peru to face the threatened invasion of San Martín from Chile. De la Pezuela agreed to promote De la Serna to lieutenant general and name him president of a council of war.

San Martin landed in Pisco, on September 7, 1819. De la Serna, through secret negotiations, was named commander-in-chief of the army gathered at Aznapuquio to protect the capital against San Martin's advance. He was ordered by the viceroy to march to Chancay.

On January 29, 1821, the principal officers of the camp, partisans of De la Serna, petitioned the viceroy to resign in favor of De la Serna. De la Pezuela refused, and ordered De la Serna to subdue the mutiny, but De la Serna claimed to be unable to do so. The viceroy turned over executive authority on the evening of the same day. Later, the results of this coup were recognized by Spain.

As viceroy of Peru

A Spanish commissioner, Captain Manuel Abreu, arrived in Lima while San Martín was threatening the capital. He brought orders to the viceroy to negotiate for a peaceful settlement. De la Serna sent him on to meet with San Martín. Negotiations did begin on May 3, 1821 at Punchauca, with representatives from both sides. The negotiations lasted until June 24, but brought no agreement. The stumbling block was independence. The insurgents demanded it, and Spain insisted on submission to the king. On June 25, hostilities began again.

De la Serna was forced to abandon the capital on July 6, 1821. San Martín entered the capital four days later, and was received by the common people with jubilation. On July 15, 1821 the Act of Independence of Peru was signed at the city hall in Lima.

De la Serna retired to Jauja, and later to Cuzco. He brought with him the first printing press in Cuzco, on which was published the famous newspaper El Depositario.

On August 24 De la Serna sent General Canterac with a force of 4,000 men to relieve Callao. Nevertheless, Callao was forced to surrender on September 19, 1821, due to lack of supplies. In Cuzco dissension broke out in the Royalist army. General Olañeta refused obedience and maintained an independent Royalist force in Alto Perú.

Canterac was defeated on August 6, 1824 by Simón Bolívar at Junín. De la Serna was now resolved to risk everything to crush the revolt. He left Cuzco in October with a well-disciplined army of 10,000 infantry and 1,600 cavalry. He met the insurgent army in the mountain plain of Ayacucho on December 8, and the following day was totally defeated by General Antonio José de Sucre. De la Serna was wounded and taken prisoner. The Royalist army had 2,000 dead and wounded and lost 3,000 prisoners, with the remainder of the army entirely dispersed. General Canterac, the second in command, signed an honorable capitulation the next day, December 9, 1824. De la Serna, who on the date of the battle had been created conde de los Andes by King Ferdinand VII, was released soon afterward and sailed for Europe. In all but name, the Spanish Viceroyalty of Peru was at an end.

Return to Spain

In Spain, De la Serna was welcomed at court and his administration was approved. He was later named captain general of Granada. He died childless in 1832 in Cádiz.

References

 Short biography (Archived 2009-10-31) at Encarta
The Battle of Ayacucho, order of battle

1770 births
1832 deaths
Counts of Spain
Spanish nobility
Viceroys of Peru
Royalists in the Hispanic American Revolution
Che Guevara
People from Jerez de la Frontera